Boureima Zongo (born 16 March 1972) is a Burkinabé former footballer who played as an attacking midfielder. He played in 25 matches for the Burkina Faso national team from 1992 to 2001. He was also named in Burkina Faso's squad for the 1998 African Cup of Nations tournament.

References

External links
 

1972 births
Living people
Burkinabé footballers
Association football midfielders
Burkina Faso international footballers
1996 African Cup of Nations players
1998 African Cup of Nations players
RC Bobo Dioulasso players
Place of birth missing (living people)
21st-century Burkinabé people